Marlowe is a 2022 neo-noir crime thriller film directed by Neil Jordan and written by William Monahan. Based on the 2014 novel The Black-Eyed Blonde by John Banville, writing under the pen name Benjamin Black, the film stars Liam Neeson as brooding private detective Philip Marlowe, a fictional character created by Raymond Chandler, and features Diane Kruger, Jessica Lange, Adewale Akinnuoye-Agbaje, Alan Cumming, Francois Arnaud, Ian Hart, Danny Huston, Daniela Melchior and Colm Meaney. 

It premiered at the 70th San Sebastián International Film Festival on 24 September 2022 and was theatrically released on 15 February 2023, by Open Road Films and Briarcliff Entertainment. The film received mixed reviews from critics.

Plot
In 1939 Los Angeles, private detective Philip Marlowe is hired by glamorous heiress Clare Cavendish to find her missing lover, Nico Peterson, a prop master at Pacific Film Studios. Marlowe quickly learns that Peterson is dead, apparently having fallen down drunk before a car accidentally ran over and crushed his head outside the exclusive luxury Corbata Club that caters only to the city's elite. Marlowe is refused entry and gets into a fight with gardeners when he tries to sneak in. His friend, homicide detective Joe Green, is not interested in reopening the case and encouraged Marlowe to accept Peterson's death. He visits Cavendish at her home to tell her of Peterson's demise, also meeting the studio's owner, Philip O'Reilly, the soon-to-be Ambassador to England. Cavendish reveals she saw Peterson drive past her while in Tijuana since his supposed death. Annoyed at her witholding this information, Marlowe goes to leave, running into Cavendish's mother, filmstar Dorothy Quincannon, who fails to learn what service Marlowe is providing to her daughter.

Marlowe visits Peterson's grave and encounters a mourning woman leaving him a note but she escapes before he can talk to her. Marlowe convinces Green to open a murder investigation now they know the body was not Peterson's. Green admonishes Marlowe for his relentless pursuit of the truth and reveals that the body was identified by the Corbata Club owner, Floyd Hanson. Marlowe meets with Hanson at the club, the pair failing to extract information from each other. On his way out, Marlowe notices the woman from the grave, Peterson's sister Lynn, and clandestinely agrees to meet with her at the Cabana club later that evening; their discussion is observed by Hanson. When he arrives, Marlowe is assaulted by two men but beats them unconscious. 

Quincannon meets Marlowe to unsuccessfully try to hire him to find Peterson for her instead. She reveals that her contentious relationship with her daughter is because she spent many years pretending Cavendish was her niece on the advice of O'Reilly, her former lover. Quincannon's former private investigator had learned that Peterson was also acting as a talent agent for actress Amanda Toxteth. Toxteth tells Marlowe that Peterson was a serial womanizer and regularly imported cocaine from Tiajuana. Out of leads, Marlowe breaks into Peterson's house and encounters Lynn before the pair are attacked by two Mexican men looking for someone named Serena. Marlowe is knocked unconscious while Lynn is taken captive. 

After waking, Marlowe is taken by drug lord Lou Hendricks and his henchman Cedric. Hendricks reveals he is after Peterson, his former drug courier, who stole a large amount of cocaine, and the Corbata helped fake Peterson's death. Marlowe has his officer friend Bernie Ohls begin searching for Lynn, while Cavendish visits Marlowe to seduce him; he rejects her advances but shares a dance before she leaves. Marlowe secretly follows Cavendish to a rendezvous with O'Reilly, and runs into Quincannon who shares her anger at her daughter's relationship with the much older and powerful O'Reilly. The following day, Ohls takes Marlowe to Lynn's discovered body, revealing she was tortured and raped before being killed. Ohls traces the Mexicans to the Corbata club and gives Marlowe his unofficial support to infilitrate the club and avenge Lynn.

Marlow confronts Hanson who offers him a drink, but suspicious Hanson poisoned it, Marlowe throws it away and feigns that he is dying. Convinced he is dead, Hanson has his men take Marlowe's body through the hedonistic areas of the club to a secret area where the Mexicans have been killed, Hendricks is being tortured, and Cedric has been restrained. Under torture, Hendricks reveals that Serena is actually the mermaid statue Peterson placed in the adjacent fish tank and it contains the missing cocaine. Marlowe frees Cedric and the pair kill Hanson and his men, inadvertently destroying the mermaid and the drugs. Cedric also kills Hendricks after being told he will be indebted for years to repay the value of the drugs. Cedric decides to work with Marlowe so they can look out for each other.

Marlowe returns home to find Peterson waiting for him. Peterson admits he does not feel guilty about Lynn's death because of her association with him, and asks Marlowe to tell Cavendish to meet him in the studio prop house for information he has gathered about O'Reilly. The fake Peterson was a musician who resembled Peterson. Peterson meets Cavendish and reveals his extensive records of every drug deal performed through the prop house with Hendricks, believing it will destroy the reputation of the studio and O'Reilly. As Marlowe arrives, Cavendish betrays Peterson, shooting him and setting both him and the evidence on fire, immolating the prop house, intending to use this deed to earn favor with O'Reilly and become vice president of the studio. She offers Marlowe a job as the studio's head of security but he declines, instead recommending Cedric.

Cast
 Liam Neeson as Philip Marlowe
 Diane Kruger as Clare Cavendish
 Jessica Lange as Dorothy Quincannon
 Adewale Akinnuoye-Agbaje as Cedric
 Colm Meaney as Bernie Ohls
 Daniela Melchior as Lynn Peterson
 Alan Cumming as Lou Hendricks
 Danny Huston as Floyd Hanson
 Seána Kerslake as Amanda Toxteth
 François Arnaud as Nico Peterson
 Ian Hart as Joe Green
 Patrick Muldoon as Richard Cavendish

Production
Marlowe is actor Liam Neeson's 100th film. William Monahan wrote the screenplay, adapting it from the 2014 novel The Black-Eyed Blonde by John Banville. Neeson came on board to star in March 2017, and Neil Jordan signed on to direct in June 2021. Additional castings were announced in November 2021.

Principal photography took place for two months, starting in November 2021. Filming for exterior scenes set in Los Angeles took place in Barcelona, Spain, while interior scenes were shot in Dublin, Ireland. Jordan cited the 1982 film Blade Runner as an influence on the film's look, stating, "I'm making a film set in L.A. in the past, but somehow it's a sci-fi film. […] It was a good reference for the designers and camera team."

Release
Marlowe had its world premiere on September 24, 2022, as the closing film of the 70th San Sebastián International Film Festival. It was originally set for a December 2, 2022, release in the United States but was delayed to February 15, 2023.

Reception

Box office 
The film made $1.8 million in its opening weekend (and a total of $2.9 million over its first five days) from 2,281 theaters, finishing in eighth.

Critical response 
 Metacritic assigned the film a weighted average score of 41 out of 100, based on 24 critics, indicating "mixed or average reviews". Audiences polled by PostTrak gave the film a 51% positive score, with 27% saying they would "definite recommend" it.

Reviewing from the San Sebastián International Film Festival, Screen Daily wrote, "With some crunchingly incongruous gags about famous screen MacGuffins, the knowing screenplay by Jordan and William Monahan...doesn't feel devious enough in its plotting or sufficiently fresh in reimagining either its hero or his LA world". Guy Lodge from Variety wrote in his review, "Jordan's film is both resolutely conservative in its period framing and irksomely postmodern in its audience pandering".

After its theatrical release, a review from Chicago Sun-Timess Richard Roeper said, "Thanks to the high-end production values, the juicy script and the vigorous performances from that first-rate cast, it's great to see another iteration of Marlowe on the case". Mick LaSalle writing for San Francisco Chronicle said, "It's not a terrible movie, but a terribly misbegotten one, off in all its details. This is the work of a reasonable, intelligent director, Neil Jordan...who had a bad idea and then compounded it with wrong choices and crazy casting." Frank Scheck from The Hollywood Reporter wrote, "But for all the authentic genre tropes on display, Marlowe never comes to life on its own, lacking the verve or wit to make it feel anything other than a great pop song played by a mediocre cover band".

References

External links
 
 
 

2022 thriller films
2020s English-language films
Spanish detective films
Spanish thriller films
French detective films
French neo-noir films
French thriller films
Films based on American novels
Films based on works by Raymond Chandler
Films directed by Neil Jordan
Films scored by David Holmes (musician)
Films set in 1939
Films set in Los Angeles
Films shot in Barcelona
Films shot in Dublin (city)
Films with screenplays by William Monahan
Open Road Films films
2020s British films
2020s French films
2020s Spanish films
Spanish neo-noir films
Irish thriller films
Irish detective films